The Athletics at the 2016 Summer Paralympics – Men's 100 metres T47 event at the 2016 Paralympic Games took place on 10–11 September 2016, at the Estádio Olímpico João Havelange.

Heats

Heat 1 
11:48 10 September 2016:

Heat 2 
11:55 10 September 2016:

Final 
10:45 11 September 2016:

Notes

Athletics at the 2016 Summer Paralympics
2016 in men's athletics